Schultz's round-eared bat (Lophostoma schulzi) is a species of bat in the family Phyllostomidae. It is found in Brazil, French Guiana, Guyana, and Suriname.

Sources

Lophostoma
Mammals described in 1980
Taxonomy articles created by Polbot